In mathematics, the Toronto function T(m,n,r) is a modification of the confluent hypergeometric function defined by , Weisstein, as

Later, Heatley (1964) recomputed to 12 decimals the table of the M(R)-function, and gave some corrections of the original tables. The table was also extended from x = 4 to x = 16 (Heatley, 1965). An example of the Toronto function has appeared in a study on the theory of turbulence (Heatley, 1965).

References

Heatley, A. H. (1964), "A short table of the Toronto function", Mathematics of Computation, 18, No.88: 361
Heatley, A. H. (1965), "An extension of the table of the Toronto function", Mathematics of Computation, 19, No.89: 118-123
Weisstein, E. W., "Toronto Function", From Math World - A Wolfram Web Resource

Special hypergeometric functions